11 is the third studio album by American rock band The Smithereens, released on October 24, 1989, by Capitol Records. It includes the Billboard Top 40 single "A Girl Like You". The album was certified gold by the Recording Industry Association of America in June 1990.

The album title was inspired by the film Ocean's 11, "with a little push from Spinal Tap's famous line, "This one goes to 11", according to guitarist Jim Babjak.

Background
The Smithereens switched producers for the album, going from Don Dixon, who had produced their first two albums, to Ed Stasium, who had produced albums by The Ramones and Living Colour. "I'm not sure what we were looking for...maybe a heavier guitar sound, like in "A Girl Like You". We were trying to preserve our integrity, yet find a home on radio", lead singer Pat DiNizio said.

"A Girl Like You" was written by DiNizio on assignment for Cameron Crowe's film Say Anything.... DiNizio based the lyrics on bits of dialogue in the screenplay. When the film's producer asked DiNizio to change the lyrics, because it revealed too much of the plot, he refused, and the band decided to keep the song for their next album, 11. Madonna was originally enlisted to sing the harmony vocals, but failed to show up for the recording session. Instead, the band got Maria Vidal to do the vocals.

The song peaked at No. 2 on Billboard's Mainstream Rock chart and at No. 3 on the magazine's Modern Rock chart. It became the band's first Top 40 entry on the Billboard Hot 100, peaking at No. 38 and spending 20 weeks on the chart.

Track listing

Personnel
Credits adapted from the album's liner notes.
The Smithereens
Pat DiNizio – vocals, guitar, string arrangement on "Blue Period"
Jim Babjak – guitar
Dennis Diken – drums, percussion, cover concept
Mike Mesaros – bass

Additional musicians
Belinda Carlisle – vocal on "Blue Period"
Michael Hamilton – guitar on "A Girl Like You", "Blues Before and After", "Room Without a View" and "Kiss Your Tears Away"
The Honeys (Ginger Blake, Diane Rovell, Marilyn Wilson) – background vocals on "Baby Be Good" and "Cut Flowers"
Kenny Margolis – piano, electric piano, accordion, harpsichord, synthesizer
Ed Stasium – background vocals, percussion
Gerri Sutyak – cello on "Blue Period"
Maria Vidal – background vocals on "A Girl Like You"

Production personnel
Jim Dineen – assistant engineer
Mick Haggerty – design
Paul Hamingson – engineer
Gina Immel – assistant engineer
Shirley Greer – assistant engineer
Dewey Nicks – photography
Ed Stasium – producer
Francine Stasium – production coordination
Tommy Steele – art direction

Charts

References

The Smithereens albums
1989 albums
Capitol Records albums
Albums produced by Ed Stasium
Enigma Records albums